Isaac Johnson (November 1, 1803 – March 15, 1853) was a US politician and the 12th Governor of the state of Louisiana.

Born on his father's plantation "Troy" near St. Francisville in West Feliciana Parish, Johnson was the fourth son of John Hunter Johnson and Thenia Munson. Johnson's grandfather, Isaac Johnson, arrived in the area in the 1770s, and his father had a leading role in the West Florida Rebellion. Later he served as a British officer in Natchez, Mississippi during the English occupation and was a lawyer, planter, parish sheriff and judge, finally settling at Fairview Plantation on Bayou Sara in Louisiana.

Johnson was taught by private tutors early and read law under his father and his uncle Joseph E. Johnson, eventually establishing his own law practice. Johnson married Charlotte McDermott in 1828. He was involved in local Democratic politics and won a seat in the Louisiana House of Representatives, serving only one term.  In 1839, Johnson was appointed a judge in the 3rd Judicial Court.

Nominated by the Democratic Party to run for governor in 1846, Johnson competed against Whig Guillaume DeBuys. Johnson won by almost 2,500 votes and assumed the office of governor at the age of 43. Louisiana had adopted a new constitution in 1845, but the unsettled nature of some of the provisions filled the Johnson Administration with confusion and turmoil; even his inaugural oath was questioned.  In his inaugural speech, Johnson called for moving the state capital from New Orleans to Baton Rouge and stressed the importance of public schools.

During his term, Governor Johnson was outspoken in his views: during the 1846–1848 U.S.-Mexican War Johnson put out a call for volunteers and had a confrontation with the Army Paymaster over maintenance of these volunteers. He announced that the United States should annex all of Mexico. On the expansion of slavery to new territories, Johnson was a champion of states' rights.  He denounced the Wilmot Proviso to prohibit slavery in territories. One of the most important accomplishments during Johnson's administration was an act establishing the University of Louisiana, a bill he signed in 1847.

Johnson's leadership was a disappointment to state Democratic leaders because he appointed Whigs to office and did not advance strict party disciplines. By 1848, he had fallen out of favor, and Democrats who supported home-state candidate Zachary Taylor helped carry the state for the Whigs in the 1848 presidential election.

In 1849, the state capitol was moved to Baton Rouge.  The following year, Governor Johnson did not run for reelection. His successor, Joseph Marshall Walker, appointed him as Attorney General of Louisiana and he served until his death in 1853.  

Johnson died of a heart attack at the Verandah Hotel in New Orleans on March 15 and was buried at Troy Plantation. Two of his sons died of yellow fever later that year.

Sources
State of Louisiana -  Biography
Cemetery Memorial by La-Cemeteries

1803 births
1853 deaths
Democratic Party governors of Louisiana
Louisiana Attorneys General
Democratic Party members of the Louisiana House of Representatives
American planters
19th-century American politicians
American lawyers admitted to the practice of law by reading law
People from St. Francisville, Louisiana